Llanismel or Llanishmael is a Welsh placename meaning "church of Saint Ismael". It may refer to either of:

 St Ishmaels in Pembrokeshire
 St Ishmael in Carmarthenshire